North Circular Road is a 25.7-mile-long ring road around Central London in London, England.

North Circular Road may also refer to:

 North Circular Road (film), a 2015 Irish film

 North Circular Road, Dublin
 North Circular Road, Limerick
 A55 road (Northern Ireland)